Alan Tarr (3 April 1901 – 7 November 1978) was a South African cricketer. He played in five first-class matches for Border in 1922/23 and 1923/24.

See also
 List of Border representative cricketers

References

External links
 

1901 births
1978 deaths
South African cricketers
Border cricketers